Thomas Ashwell  (18 July 1897 – 21 December 1969) was English cricketer. He played one first-class match for Oxford University Cricket Club in 1919.

Ashwell was educated at Rugby School, then joined the army during World War I. He was an officer in the Rifle Brigade. In 1917 he was awarded the MC: After the war he went up to Brasenose College, Oxford.

See also
 List of Oxford University Cricket Club players

References

External links
 

1897 births
1969 deaths
English cricketers
Oxford University cricketers
Cricketers from Nottingham
People educated at Rugby School
Alumni of Brasenose College, Oxford
Rifle Brigade officers
British Army personnel of World War I
Recipients of the Military Cross
Military personnel from Nottingham